Maurice Lee Barksdale (born January 7, 1939) is an American banker and former public official who served as the United States Assistant Secretary of Housing and Urban Development for Housing during the presidency of Ronald Reagan. As of 2021, Barksdale was managing partner of Secor Capital, a Texas-based real estate investment firm.

References

External links
 Video of 1989 congressional testimony of Barksdale

1939 births
United States Assistant Secretaries of Housing and Urban Development
University of Texas at Austin alumni
Living people